The Tale of Ragnar Lodbrok is an Icelandic legendary saga of the 13th century about the Viking ruler Ragnar Lodbrok. It is part of the manuscript of the Völsunga saga, which it immediately follows. The tale covers the origin of Aslaug, Ragnar's quest for the hand of Þóra Borgarhjǫrtr, his later marriage to Aslaug, the deeds of their sons (and Aslaug) in battle, and Ragnar's death at the hands of king Ælla of Northumbria.

Literary context
The saga's sources include Adam of Bremen and Saxo Grammaticus, with whose Gesta Danorum (book IX) it overlaps in the description of Ragnar's pursuit of Thora, his marriage to Aslaug, and the deeds of his sons. Ragnars saga is a sequel of sorts to the Völsunga saga, providing a link between the  legendary figures of Sigurd and Brynhildr and the historical events of the 9th to 11th centuries, as well as prestige to the Norwegian royal house by portraying Sigurd as its ancestor.

See also
Ragnar Lodbrok

References

Bibliography

External links

 Modern Icelandic spelling edition at Netútgáfan

Legendary sagas
Cultural depictions of Ragnar Lodbrok
Sources of Norse mythology
Völsung cycle
Icelandic literature
Works based on Gesta Danorum